Vehicle registration plates in Northern Ireland use a modified version of the British national registration plate system that was initiated for the whole of the United Kingdom of Great Britain and Ireland in 1903. Originally, all counties in the UK were allocated two identification letters. At that time, the whole of Ireland was in the UK, and the letters I and Z were reserved for the Irish counties. The 'I' series was used first, but by the time it came to using the 'Z' series in 1926, the Irish Free State had already come into existence, and so it was agreed that the Northern Ireland would use the AZ – YZ series, while the Free State would use the ZA – ZZ series. In 1987, the Republic of Ireland broke away from the system altogether. As of 2002 there were reportedly 794,477 recorded registration plates in Northern Ireland, compared to only 50 for the island as a whole when the format was first introduced in 1903.

The full list of codes used in Northern Ireland appears below.

Format

As in Great Britain, each code originally ran from 1 to 9999, and when one was completed, another was allocated. All possible codes had been allocated by 1957, following which reversed sequences were introduced, the first county to do so being Antrim in January 1958 with 1 IA. These reversed sequences were completed quickly, leading to the introduction of the current "AXX 1234" format in January 1966, where "XX" is the county code and "A" is a serial letter. This format allowed capacity to be increased. Each county adopted it once they had completed their reversed sequences, the last one to do so being County Londonderry in October 1973 with AIW 1. From November 1985, the first 100 numbers of each series were withheld for use as cherished registrations. From April 1989, the numbers 101-999 were also withheld in this way. Even multiples of 1000 and 1111 ("four-of-a-kind") are deemed cherished by the DVLA and thus withheld. Each series ends at 9998 and follows on to the next letter/number combination in the series.

International vehicle registration code on the number plates 
The distinguishing code for the United Kingdom, including Northern Ireland is "UK". Prior to 28 September 2021, "GB" was used.  Number plates featuring other codes, such as "NI" or "IRL" (the distinguishing code for Ireland) are unofficial. From October 2021 if an owner of a vehicle wishes to avoid attaching a separate black on white “UK” sticker, it is necessary for the number plates to display “UK” on the left side. If the vehicle is driven in a country not a party to the Vienna Convention, a separate sign (black on white “UK” sticker) also has to be displayed at the rear of the vehicle. Of the EU countries, a separate identifier is only needed when travelling in Cyprus, Malta, and Spain, as they are not party to the convention.

While motorists with vehicles registered in Great Britain are permitted by the DVLA to use number plates carrying Euro-style bands with UK national flags and country codes (such as ENG, England or SCO), this is not possible in Northern Ireland. The Road Vehicles (Display of Registration Marks) (Amendment) Regulations 2009 state that "Paragraph (4) does not apply—(...) (b)if the relevant vehicle is recorded in the part of the register relating to Northern Ireland." Paragraph four reads "Subject to paragraphs (5) to (8), there may be displayed on a plate or other device an arrangement of letters corresponding with one of the sub-paragraphs of paragraph (9) and an emblem corresponding with one of the sub-paragraphs of paragraph (10)".

European Union symbol 
When the UK was a member state of the European Union, it was possible to choose to display number plates conforming to the common EU format introduced by Council Regulation (EC) No 2411/98, with a blue strip on the left side of the plate with the European Union symbol (circle of stars) above the international vehicle registration code of the member state (GB). This format can not be issued after the transition period ended. With Northern Ireland no longer being a part of the EU, the plates with the EU symbol are now no longer issued.

EU member states that require foreign vehicles to display a distinguishing sign of the country of origin are obliged by Article 3 of EU Regulation No. 2411/98 to accept this standard design as a distinguishing sign when displayed on a vehicle registered in another member state, making a separate sign unnecessary for vehicles registered in the EU.

After Brexit, other EU countries are no longer required to accept UK "Europlates", as the regulation only requires member states to accept the standard design as a distinguishing sign when displayed on a vehicle registered in another member state. After this, Euro-plates must be replaced by a number plate that features the UK code (GB before 28 September 2021) in order to be valid as a national identifier.

Administration
The administrative counties of Northern Ireland were abolished by the Local Government Act (Northern Ireland) 1972, and their responsibility for issuing registrations was transferred to the NI Ministry of Home Affairs, and later the Department of the Environment NI. The former vehicle section in the county town of each local authority became a "local office" of the relevant departmental agency, formerly Driver and Vehicle Licensing Northern Ireland and latterly the Driver and Vehicle Agency (DVA) in Coleraine.

From 21 July 2014, vehicle registration in Northern Ireland became the responsibility of the Driver and Vehicle Licensing Agency DVLA in Swansea, which also administers the system used in Great Britain. The pre-1972 format of Northern Ireland registration plates continues unchanged in Northern Ireland. When the current system is exhausted the format will be swapped so NNNN LLL for example 1232 AIL.

County codes in alphabetical order
All the codes from IA to IZ, and from AI to WI (except for those containing G, Q, S and V, plus II), were allocated throughout the island of Ireland in 1903, in alphabetical order of counties and then of county boroughs. Hence, Antrim was allocated IA and Armagh IB, while County Dublin, now in the Republic of Ireland, was allocated IK, in between IJ for Down and IL for Fermanagh. Shortly before the partition of Ireland in 1922, Belfast completed OI and was thus allocated the next available code, XI, while YI and then ZI were allocated to Dublin City. After the partition, all codes with Z as the first letter (ZA, ZB etc.) were allocated in the Republic of Ireland, while all codes with Z as the second letter (AZ, BZ etc.) were allocated in Northern Ireland with the exception of County Mayo which had originally been allocated IZ.

Series per administrative county / DVA licensing local office
For each DVA licensing local office (administrative county before 1974) the two-letter sequences are shown first, followed by the reversed two-letter sequences, then the three-letter sequences.

See also 

 Vehicle registration plates of the United Kingdom
 Vehicle registration plates of the Republic of Ireland

Notes

References 
Citations

Sources

External links 
 

Northern Ireland
 
Road transport in the United Kingdom